K Shipbuilding Co., Ltd. is a South Korean shipbuilding company. It was the world's fourth largest shipbuilder, owning STX Europe, Europe's second-largest shipbuilding group (divested in 2017 after bankruptcy). It has built about 700 ships over the last 40 years in Busan and Changwon.

References

External links
 

Shipbuilding companies of South Korea
Companies that have filed for bankruptcy in South Korea